Zoltán Mádi (born 23 March 1961) is a Hungarian politician, who served as Mayor of Nyíregyháza between 1990 and 1994. He also functioned as managing director of the Comedy Theatre of Budapest since 2004. His younger brother is László Mádi, a former Member of Parliament.

References
Rendszerváltók 1 - Interjú Mádi Zoltánnal, aki 1990-1994-ig volt Nyíregyháza polgármestere, nyiregyhaza.biz; accessed 22 July 2020 (in Hungarian).

1961 births
Living people
Fidesz politicians
Mayors of places in Hungary
People from Nyíregyháza